The Connecticut League, also known as the Connecticut State League, was a professional baseball association of teams in the state of Connecticut. The league began as offshoot of the original Connecticut State League, which dates back as far as 1884. In 1891, the Connecticut State League included the Ansonia Cuban Giants, a team made up of entirely African-American ballplayers, including future Hall of Famers Frank Grant and Sol White. In 1902, it was a Class D league with teams in eight cities. In 1905, the league became Class B, which lasted until 1913, when the league became the Eastern Association due to several teams outside of the state entering the league. Also a Class B league, it survived two more seasons, then folded after the 1914 season.

Connecticut League teams
Rockland Base Ball Club — 1884. Rockland, Maine

Cities Represented
Ansonia, CT: Ansonia Cuban Giants 1888, 1891; Ansonia Welcomes 1896
Bridgeport, CT: Bridgeport Giants 1888; Bridgeport Victors 1895-96; Bridgeport Misfits 1897; Bridgeport Orators 1898-1912 
Bristol, CT: Bristol 1891; Bristol Braves 1897; Bristol Bellmakers 1899-1900; Bristol Woodchoppers 1901 
Danbury, CT: Danbury 1888; Danbury Hatters 1898 
Derby, CT: Derby Angels 1896-1898, 1900-1901; Derby Lushers 1899 
Hartford, CT: Hartford 1884; Hartford Babies 1885; Hartford Bluebirds 1895; Hartford Senators 1902-1912 
Holyoke, MA: Holyoke Paperweights 1903-1906; Holyoke Papermakers 1907-1912 
Meriden, CT: Meriden 1884 1888, 1891, 1908; Meriden Maroons 1885; Meriden Silvermen 1895; Meriden Bulldogs 1897-1898; Meriden Silverites 1899-1905 
New Britain, CT: New Britain 1884-1885, 1891; New Britain Rangers 1898; New Britain Perfectos 1908-1911; New Britain Spuds 1912 
New Haven, CT: New Haven Edgewoods 1896; New Haven Students 1898; New Haven Blues 1899-1908; New Haven Black Crows 1909; New Haven Prairie Hens 1910; New Haven Murlins 1911-1912 
New London, CT: New London Whalers 1898-1907 
Northampton, MA: Northampton Meadowlarks 1909-1911 
Norwalk, CT: Norwalk 1888 
Norwich, CT: Norwich 1891; Norwich Jackroses 1899; Norwich Witches 1900; Norwich Champs 1901; Norwich Reds 1902-1903, 1905-1907; Norwich Indians 1904 
Portland, CT: Portland 1891 
Rockville, CT: Rockville 1884 
Southington, CT: Southington 1891 
Springfield, MA: Springfield Ponies 1902-1912 
Stamford, CT: Stamford 1888 
Torrington, CT: Torrington Tornados 1896; Torrington Demons 1897 
Waterbury, CT: Waterbury 1884, 1885, 1888, 1891; Waterbury Brassmen 1895; Waterbury Indians 1897; Waterbury Pirates 1898 Waterbury Rough Riders 1899-1902; Waterbury Authors 1906-1908; Waterbury Invincibles 1909; Waterbury Finnegans 1910; Waterbury Champs 1911; Waterbury Spuds 1912 
West Haven, CT: West Haven 1891 
Willimantic, CT: Willimantic 1884 
Winsted, CT: Winsted Blues 1896 
Worcester, MA: Worcester Reds 1904

Yearly standings

No Classification 1884 to 1891
1884 Connecticut State League
  Willimantic expelled September 3. The league played two games each week: Wednesdays and Saturdays 

1885 Connecticut State League President:  (Continuation of the Southern New England League) 
  New Britain disbanded September 8 

1888 Connecticut State League President: J. Howard Taylor 
  Bridgeport transferred to Stamford in May, then disbanded June 27.  Danbury disbanded June 5. The league disbanded July 25. 

1891 Connecticut State League President: A.W. Lang 
 Hartford disbanded June 10;  Portland disbanded June 10.

Class B 1894 to 1896
1894 Connecticut State LeagueStandings unknown

1895 Connecticut State League President: Jim O'Rourke 
 

1896 Connecticut State League
 President: D.W. Porter (aka Naugatuck Valley State League)

Class F 1897 to 1907
 
1897 Connecticut State League President: Sturgis Whitlock 
 

1898 Connecticut State League President: Sturgis Whitlock 
 New Britain disbanded June 23. Derby disbanded June 25. 

1899 Connecticut State League - schedule President: Tim Murnane 
 No Playoffs. 
1900 Connecticut State League President: Sturgis Whitlock
 No Playoffs. 

1901 Connecticut State League President: Tim Murnane 
 No Playoffs.

Class D 1902 to 1904

1902 Connecticut State League President: Jim O'Rourke / Sturgis Whitlock 
 No Playoffs. 

1903 Connecticut State League  President: Sturgis Whitlock 
 No Playoffs: 12 Holyoke games (8-4) were deducted after the season due to ineligible player violations.

1904 Connecticut League President: Jim O'Rourke 
Worcester (26-11) moved to Norwich June 21.No Playoffs.

Class B 1905 to 1912
1905 Connecticut State League President: Jim O'Rourke 
No Playoffs. 
1906 Connecticut State League President: Jim O'Rourke 
No Playoffs. 

1907 Connecticut State League President: W. J. Tracey
No Playoffs. 

1908 Connecticut State League President: W. J. Tracey 
No Playoffs. 

1909 Connecticut State League President: Jim O'Rourke 
No Playoffs.  

1910 Connecticut State League  - schedule President: W.J. Tracy]
No Playoffs. 

1911 Connecticut State League President: Jim O'Rourke 
Northampton and Holyoke disbanded June 26.No Playoffs. 

1912 Connecticut State League President: Jim O'Rourk 
New Britain (12-22) moved to Waterbury June 15.No Playoffs.

References

External links
Baseball Reference
Minor League Baseball page
Historic North Hampton

 
1884 establishments in Connecticut
1912 disestablishments in Connecticut
Baseball leagues in Connecticut
Baseball leagues in Massachusetts
Colonial League
Sports leagues disestablished in 1912
Sports leagues established in 1884